Rouville may refer to the following places: 

 Rouville, Oise, a commune in the Oise department, France
 Rouville, Seine-Maritime, a commune in the Seine-Maritime department, France
 Rouville Regional County Municipality, Quebec, an administrative unit in Quebec, Canada
 Domaine de Rouville DGC, a disc golf course in Saint-Jean-Baptiste, Quebec, Canada